Cheshmeh Khani may refer to:
Cheshmeh Khani, Chaharmahal and Bakhtiari
Cheshmeh Khani, Kermanshah
Cheshmeh Khani, Kohgiluyeh and Boyer-Ahmad
Cheshmeh Khani, Delfan, a village in Delfan County, Lorestan Province, Iran
Cheshmeh Khani, Kakavand, a village in Delfan County, Lorestan Province, Iran
Cheshmeh Khani-ye Olya, a village in Delfan County, Lorestan Province, Iran
Cheshmeh Khani-ye Sofla, a village in Delfan County, Lorestan Province, Iran